Ofèlia Dracs was a literary collective of Catalan writers. Set up in 1976 or 1977, the name originates from the initials of the surnames of its founders: Miquel Desclot, Carles Reig, Josep Albanell, Jaume Cabré and Joaquim Soler; it also included Jaume Fuster, Xavier Romeu and Maria Antònia Oliver Cabrer.

The collective circled around a nucleus of authors. Including the founders, these were Joan Rendé, Joaquim Carbó, Vicenç Villatoro, Margarida Aritzeta, and Isidre Grau. There were occasional contributors (Quim Monzó, Josep Maria Illa, Carme Riera, Joana Escobedo in the early years; Assumpció Cantalozella and Roser Vernet joined in the latter period). After the group's failed first work, Desclot and Reig departed it.

Hoping to reach a new readership in the Catalan language, the group published genre literature, particularly crime, science fiction, erotica, as well as a book of gastronomy, arguing that Catalan literature had the same right to a complete range of narratives as other languages. Furthermore, they resisted assimilation into the cultural 'normalisation' demanded under the Franco regime; instead, they were feminist, socialist and separatist.

In the collections of Dracs, the writers were anonymous and would later be revealed only when their works reappeared in their own named publications.

Deu pometes té el pomer (Ten little apples has the apple tree) was the first publication of the collective. The book of erotic stories won the Premi La Sonrisa Vertical (Vertical Smile Prize) in 1980.

The collection of detective stories Negra i consentida (1983) comprised works both by authors who had previously published in the genre as well as first-time crime story writers, such as Antoni Serra and Maria Antònia Oliver Cabrer, and provided scope for their various interpretations of the genre.

Selected works
  (Genre: erotica)
  (Genre: horror)
  (Genre: crime)
  (Genre: science fiction)
  (Theme: gastronomy)
  (Genre: crime)

References

Bibliography
 
 
 

Cultural history of Spain
Culture in Barcelona
Literary circles